The 2004 African U-19 Women's Championship was the second edition of the African under-19 women's football championship. The winners of the tournament Nigeria have qualified to the 2004 FIFA U-20 Women's World Cup.

First round

|}

Equatorial Guinea won 2−1 on aggregate and advanced to the Semifinals.

South Africa won on walkover after Madagascar did not appear for the first leg and advanced to the Semifinals.

DR Congo won on walkover after Mozambique did not appear for the first leg and advanced to the Semifinals.

Semifinals

|}

Nigeria won 7−0 on aggregate and advanced to the final.

South Africa won on walkover after DR Congo did not appear for the first leg and advanced to the final.

Final

|}

Nigeria won 1−0 on aggregate and became the champion.

Qualified teams for FIFA U-20 Women's World Cup
The following team from CAF qualified for the 2004 FIFA U-20 Women's World Cup.

1 Bold indicates champions for that year. Italic indicates hosts for that year.

References

External links
African Women U-19 Championship 2002 – rsssf.com

African U-20 Women's World Cup qualification
African U-20 Cup of Nations for Women
African U-20 Cup of Nations for Women
2004 in youth association football